The Robert Long House is a rowhouse in the Fell's Point neighborhood of Baltimore. The house is the oldest known surviving urban residence within the city of Baltimore, built in 1765. It was built as the home of Robert Long, a local Baltimore merchant, and today serves as the home of the Fells Point Preservation Society, who saved it from demolition in 1969 by purchasing it and restoring it.

The house is atypical of the surrounding area, with the architecture of the house matching that of homes built in the southern part of Pennsylvania where Long was born, rather than the standard rowhomes that make up the Fells Point neighborhood. The home was originally a two-story rowhome, with the third floor added sometime in the mid to late 1800s, covered with a mixture of tar and granite, known as "flint coat".

References

External links 

Houses in Baltimore
Residential buildings completed in 1765
Museums in Baltimore
Historic house museums in Maryland
Baltimore City Landmarks